Udall is an American political family.

Udall may also refer to:

Members of the Udall political family
Brady Udall (fl. 2010s), American author
David King Udall (1851–1938), American politician and Mormon pioneer
Don Taylor Udall (1897–1976), former state representative in Arizona
Ella Stewart Udall (1855–1937), first telegraph operator in the Arizona Territory
Jesse Addison Udall (1893–1980), former Chief Justice of the Arizona Supreme Court
John Hunt Udall (1889–1959), former mayor of Phoenix, Arizona
John Nicholas Udall (1913–2005), former mayor of Phoenix, Arizona, and Superior Court judge
Levi Stewart Udall (1891–1960), former Chief Justice of the Arizona Supreme Court
Mark Udall (born 1950), former U.S. Senator from Colorado
Michelle Udall (fl. 2010s), member of the Arizona House of Representatives
Mo Udall (1922–1998), former U.S. Representative from Arizona
Stewart Udall (1920–2010), former U.S. Representative from Arizona and Secretary of the Interior
Tom Udall (born 1948), former U.S. Senator from New Mexico

Other people
Ephraim Udall (died 1647), English Royalist divine
Nicholas Udall (1504–1556), English playwright
Richard Athil Udall (1811–1883), American politician

Places
Udall, Kansas, U.S.
Udall, Missouri, U.S.
Point Udall (Guam), the westernmost point in the U.S.
Point Udall (U.S. Virgin Islands), the easternmost point in the U.S.

Other uses
Morris K. Udall and Stewart L. Udall Foundation, an Executive Branch office of the U.S. Government
Melvin Udall, a character in the movie As Good as It Gets, played by Jack Nicholson

See also
Udal (surname)
Uldall